Aleksandr Borisovich Chakovsky (August 26, 1913 – February 17, 1994) was a Soviet/Russian editor and novelist; editor-in-chief of "Literaturnaya Gazeta" from 1962 to 1988. A hard-line Communist, he served as an unofficial cultural arbiter through his position in the powerful Writers' Union.

Honours and awards
 Stalin Prize, 3rd class (1950) – for the novel "We already Morning" (1949)
 Lenin Prize (1978) – for the novel "The Siege"
 USSR State Prize (1983) – for the novel "Victory"
 Vasilyev Brothers State Prize of the RSFSR (1980) – a script for the film "Siege" (1973, 1977)
 Four Orders of Lenin
 Order of the October Revolution
 Order of the Red Banner of Labour
 Order of the Red Star
 Hero of Socialist Labour

References

External links

1913 births
1994 deaths
Soviet writers
Heroes of Socialist Labour
Lenin Prize winners
Stalin Prize winners
Recipients of the USSR State Prize
Recipients of the Vasilyev Brothers State Prize of the RSFSR
Recipients of the Order of Lenin
Maxim Gorky Literature Institute alumni